Predrag Erak (born 1 July 1970) is a Bosnian Serb football manager and former player.

Playing career

Club
Born in Travnik, SR Bosnia and Herzegovina, he started playing with NK Vlašić Turbe.  Then he played for NK Čelik Zenica and HNK Hajduk Split in the Yugoslav First League. In 1991, he moved to Greece where he played during the entire decade of the 1990s, first with Iraklis Thessaloniki F.C., and then with Apollon Smyrni F.C., Aris Thessaloniki F.C. and Atromitos F.C., returning in 2001 to play in Serbia with FK Sloga Kraljevo and FK Zemun.

International
He played for Yugoslavia U-21 in 1990.

Managerial career
From 2008 to 2013, he has been the assistant manager of Ivan Jovanović in the Cypriot club APOEL.

From 2013 to 2016, he served as the assistant manager of Ivan Jovanović in Al-Nasr Dubai.

From 2021 serves at Panathinaikos along with Ivan Jovanović.

References

External sources
 Playing career at Playerhistory

1970 births
Living people
People from Travnik
Serbs of Bosnia and Herzegovina
Association football defenders
Yugoslav footballers
Yugoslavia under-21 international footballers
Bosnia and Herzegovina footballers
NK Čelik Zenica players
HNK Hajduk Split players
Iraklis Thessaloniki F.C. players
Apollon Smyrnis F.C. players
Aris Thessaloniki F.C. players
Atromitos F.C. players
FK Sloga Kraljevo players
FK Zemun players
OFK Bačka players
Yugoslav First League players
Super League Greece players
Second League of Serbia and Montenegro players
Bosnia and Herzegovina expatriate footballers
Expatriate footballers in Greece
Bosnia and Herzegovina expatriate sportspeople in Greece
Expatriate footballers in Serbia and Montenegro
Bosnia and Herzegovina expatriate sportspeople in Serbia and Montenegro
Serbian football managers
Bosnia and Herzegovina expatriate sportspeople in Cyprus
Bosnia and Herzegovina expatriate sportspeople in the United Arab Emirates